Lawrence Ira "Larry" Brezner (August 23, 1942 – October 5, 2015) was an American film producer, most notable for producing films such as Good Morning, Vietnam, Throw Momma from the Train, and Ride Along.

Life and career 
Born in the Bronx in New York City in 1942,  Brezner studied at the University of Bridgeport and St. John's University from which he graduated with a Masters in Psychology. He then was a teacher at an elementary school in Spanish Harlem before he moved on to the entertainment industry. In 1974 he opened a night club in Manhattan, where he met the producer Jack Rollins. In the same year he joined the company of Rollins & Charles H. Joffe with Buddy Morra and was their partner in the late 1970s. After Rollins and Joffe withdrew from the company, he, Buddy Morra, David Steinberg and Stephen Tenenbaum formed a new company, MBST Entertainment, Inc. (Morra Brezner Steinberg & Tenenbaum). His first wife was the singer Melissa Manchester; they met when she performed at his club, and Brezner managed her career during their seven-year marriage. His second marriage to Bett Zimmerman also ended in divorce.

From the mid-1980s, Brezner served as the executive producer for various comedy specials on US television. Brezner also managed the careers of artists such as Billy Crystal, Robin Williams, Martin Short, Bette Midler and many other comedic talents.

In 1981 his first film project was the original Arthur, his first project as film producer in 1984 was Throw Momma from the Train. This was followed by  Good Morning, Vietnam, The 'Burbs, and The Vanishing "Krippendorf's Tribe", "The Greatest Game". In 2014 he produced the comedy Ride Along. His final project, Ride Along 2, was released in January 2016.

He died in Duarte, California in October 2015 from leukemia, which was diagnosed a few months earlier. Brezner is survived by his third wife, Dominique Cohen-Brezner, and two daughters, Lauren Azbill and China Brezner.

Selected filmography 
He was a producer in all films unless otherwise noted.

Film

Thanks

Television

Thanks

References

External links 
 

1942 births
2015 deaths
People from the Bronx
Film producers from New York (state)
Deaths from leukemia
Deaths from cancer in California